The Thomas F. Eagleton United States Courthouse is the largest single courthouse in the United States. It is the main office of the United States District Court for the Eastern District of Missouri and the United States Court of Appeals for the Eighth Circuit. It was named after U.S. Senator Thomas F. Eagleton.

It is the fifth tallest habitable building in Missouri. It is located in downtown St. Louis at 111 South 10th Street. The exterior of the courthouse follows a classical tripartite scheme, a scheme that uses the split-level stacking concept. The construction of the building was completed in 2000. The architects involved with the building were Hellmuth, Obata & Kassabaum and EDM Incorporated. The building cost $186 million to build.

See also
List of tallest buildings in Missouri
List of tallest buildings in St. Louis

Notes

Federal courthouses in the United States
Skyscraper office buildings in St. Louis
Government buildings completed in 2000
2000 establishments in Missouri
Downtown St. Louis
Buildings and structures in St. Louis